Charles Edward "Buddy" Rogers (August 13, 1904 – April 21, 1999) was an American film actor and musician. During the peak of his popularity in the late 1920s and early 1930s, he was publicized as "America's Boyfriend".

Life and career

Early years 

Rogers was born to Maude and Bert Henry Rogers in Olathe, Kansas. He studied at the University of Kansas where he became an active member of Phi Kappa Psi. In the mid-1920s he began acting professionally in Hollywood films. A talented trombonist skilled on several other musical instruments, Rogers performed with his own dance band in motion pictures and on radio. During World War II, he served in the United States Navy as a flight training instructor. 

According to American Dance Bands On Record and Film (1915–1942), compiled by Richard J. Johnson and Bernard H. Shirley (Rustbooks Publishing, 2010), Rogers was not a bandleader in the usual sense of the term. Instead, he was a film actor who fronted bands for publicity purposes. In 1933–34, Rogers took over the popular Joe Haymes orchestra, to which he added drummer Gene Krupa. His later bands were organized by Milt Shaw.

In 1930, he recorded two records for Columbia as a solo singer with a small jazz band accompanying. In 1932, he signed with Victor and recorded four dance band records with a group organized by drummer, and later actor, Jess Kirkpatrick. In 1938, he signed with Vocalion and recorded six swing records (see discography below).

Career 

Nicknamed "Buddy", his most-remembered performance in film was opposite Clara Bow in the 1927 Academy Award winning Wings, the first film ever honored as Best Picture.  In 1968, he appeared as himself in an episode of Petticoat Junction titled "Wings", a direct reference to the silent movie.

Recognition 
For his contribution to the motion picture industry, Rogers has a star on the Hollywood Walk of Fame at 6135 Hollywood Blvd, which was dedicated on February 8, 1960.

Respected by his peers for his work in film and for his humanitarianism, the Academy of Motion Picture Arts and Sciences honored Rogers in 1986 with The Jean Hersholt Humanitarian Award.

A Golden Palm Star on the Palm Springs Walk of Stars was dedicated to him in 1993.

Personal life 
On June 24, 1937, Rogers became the third husband of silent film actress Mary Pickford. Their romance had begun in 1927, when they co-starred in My Best Girl, but the two kept their relationship hidden until Pickford's separation and 1936 divorce from Douglas Fairbanks. The couple adopted two children—Roxanne (born 1944, adopted in 1944) and Ronald Charles (born 1937, adopted in 1943)—and remained married for 42 years until Pickford's death in 1979.

In 1981, Rogers married real estate agent Beverly Ricono.

Death 
Rogers died at his home in Rancho Mirage, California, on April 21, 1999, at the age of 94 of natural causes, and was interred at Forest Lawn Cemetery, Cathedral City, near Palm Springs.

Partial filmography 

 Fascinating Youth (1926) - Teddy Ward
 More Pay, Less Work (1926) - Willia Hinchfield
 So's Your Old Man (1926) - Kenneth Murchison
 Wings (1927) - Jack Powell
 My Best Girl (1927) - Joe Grant
 Get Your Man (1927) - Robert Albin
 Abie's Irish Rose (1928) - Abie Levy
 Varsity (1928) - Jimmy Duffy
 Someone to Love (1928) - William Shelby
 Red Lips (1928) - Hugh Carver / Buddy
 Close Harmony (1929) - Al West
 River of Romance (1929) - Tom Rumford
 Illusion (1929) - Carlee Thorpe
 Half Way to Heaven (1929) - Ned Lee
 Young Eagles (1930) - Lieutenant Robert Banks
 Paramount on Parade (1930) - Buddy Rogers - Episode 'Love Time'
 Safety in Numbers (1930) - William Butler Reynolds
 Follow Thru (1930) - Jerry Downes
 Heads Up (1930) - Jack Mason
 Along Came Youth (1930) - Larry Brooks
 The Slippery Pearls (1931, Short) - 'Buddy' Rogers
 The Lawyer's Secret (1931) - Laurie Roberts
 The Road to Reno (1931) - Tom Wood
 Working Girls (1931) - Boyd Wheeler
 This Reckless Age (1932) - Bradley Ingals
 Best of Enemies (1933) - Jimmie Hartman
 Take a Chance (1933) - Kenneth Raleigh
 Dance Band (1935) - Buddy Morgan
 Old Man Rhythm (1935) - Johnny Roberts
 One in a Million (1936) - Pierre
 Let's Make a Night of It (1937) - Jack Kent
 This Way Please (1937) - Brad Morgan
 Golden Hoofs (1941) - Dean MacArdle
 The Mexican Spitfire's Baby (1941) - Dennis Lindsay
 Sing for Your Supper (1941) - Larry Hays
 Mexican Spitfire at Sea (1942) - Dennis Lindsay
 Mexican Spitfire Sees a Ghost (1942) - Dennis Lindsay
 Twelfth Street Rag (1942) - Himself
 An Innocent Affair (1948) - Claude Kimball
 The Parson and the Outlaw (1957) - Rev. Jericho Jones

Discography 

As Charles "Buddy" Rogers (America's Boy Friend)

 February 27, 1930 & March 4, 1930
 (I'd like to be) A Bee in Your Boudoir/My Future Just Passed (Columbia 2183-D)
 March 4, 1930
 Any Time's the Time to Fall in Love/(Up on Top of a Rainbow) Sweepin' the Clouds Away (Columbia 2143-D)

As Buddy Rogers and His California Cavaliers
 April 18, 1932
 You Fascinate Me/Hello,Gorgeous (Victor 24001)
 May 11, 1932
 In My Hideaway/Happy-Go-Lucky You (And Broken-Hearted Me) (Victor 24015)
 May 18, 1932
 I Beg Your Pardon, Mademoiselle/With My Sweetie in the Moonlight (Victor 24031)
 Please Handle with Care/Ask Yourself Who Loves You (Victor 24049)

As Buddy Rogers and his Famous Swing Band
(vocals by Buddy Rogers, except Bob Hannon# or Joe Mooney@, or Elizabeth Tilton$)
 April 15, 1938
 Lovelight in the Starlight#/This Time It's Real# (Vocalion 4058)
 Moonshine over Kentucky (v/BR)/Little Lady Make-Believe# (Vocalion 4071)
 June 29, 1938
 Figaro#/Meet the Beat of My Heart# (Vocalion 4227)
 Happy as a Lark (v/BR)/The Sunny Side of Things@ (Vocalion 4240)
 September 17, 1938
 You Can't Be Mine (And Someone Else's Too)$/While A Cigarette Was Burning$ (Vocalion 4408)
 This Is Madness (to Love Like This)#/Rainbow 'Round the Moon (instrumental) (Vocalion 4422)

References

Sources

External links 

 
 
 Photographs and bibliography
 
 Mary Pickford-Buddy Rogers correspondence, 1943–1976, held by the Billy Rose Theatre Division, New York Public Library for the Performing Arts

1904 births
1999 deaths
American jazz trombonists
Male trombonists
American male film actors
American male silent film actors
United States Navy personnel of World War II
Burials at Forest Lawn Cemetery (Cathedral City)
Jean Hersholt Humanitarian Award winners
People from Olathe, Kansas
People from Rancho Mirage, California
United States Navy officers
University of Kansas alumni
20th-century American male actors
20th-century American musicians
20th-century trombonists
American male jazz musicians
20th-century American male musicians
Jazz musicians from California
Military personnel from California